Ferdinand Weinwurm (born 29 April 1990) is an Austrian footballer who currently plays for SC Retz.

References

External links
 

1990 births
Living people
Austrian footballers
SV Horn players
SK Rapid Wien players
2. Liga (Austria) players
Austrian Football Bundesliga players
Association football defenders
People from Hollabrunn
Footballers from Lower Austria